Gosslingiaceae is a family of extinct zosterophylls. The zosterophylls were among the first vascular plants in the fossil record, and are considered to share an ancestor with the living lycophytes. The family is variously placed in the order Sawdoniales or the order Gosslingiales.

Genera
Genera that have been placed in this family by Kenrick and Crane in 1997 and Hao and Xue in 2013 are shown in the table below.

References

Zosterophylls
Prehistoric plant families